Piano Quintet No. 2 may refer to:

 Piano Quintet No. 2 (Dvořák)
 Piano Quintet No. 2 (Farrenc)
 Piano Quintet No. 2 (Fauré)